Thomas de Hertford was Archdeacon of Barnstaple until 1271 and also Archdeacon of Totnes from 1270 to 1275.

References

Archdeacons of Barnstaple
Archdeacons of Totnes